Wardian London is a residential-led development under construction at Marsh Wall on the Isle of Dogs, London from Eco World-Ballymore and designed by architect firm Glenn Howells. The scheme consists of two skyscrapers, approved by Tower Hamlets council in November 2014 and completed in August 2020. Wardian London is one of the tallest residential developments in London and the United Kingdom.

Background and design

Original plans 
Prior to the current scheme, developer Ballymore had been granted planning permission for a 525,000 sq ft office development on the same site. This proposal consisted of two towers of 26 and 16 storeys. Building work got as far as completing part of the basement before Ballymore abandoned the scheme due to a lack of tenancy agreements.

New proposal 

In 2013, Ballymore applied for new planning permission for two, residential-led towers designed by Glenn Howells Architects in the Isle of Dogs, just south of Canary Wharf.  The scheme was granted planning permission on 6 November 2014 by councillors at Tower Hamlets council.

The two towers are 55 and 50 storeys. The skyscrapers are linked at their base by a podium. In total, the development will provide 766 residential apartments.

In 2015, the development name was changed from Arrowhead Quay to Wardian London.

Sale 

In January 2015, Ballymore announced a deal with Malaysian property investment company, Eco World, in which Ballymore sold Wardian London to Eco World as well as two other schemes, namely, Embassy Gardens and phase two of its London City Island development for £428m. This created a holding company known as Eco World-Ballymore Holding Company Limited. Ballymore own 25 per cent of the company and Eco World own the remaining 75 per cent. However, Ballymore will continue to manage the three schemes within the new company.

Construction 
Construction for the two towers topped out in August 2019, with the first residents moving in during early 2020. Final construction of the development is due to be complete in early 2021.

Location 
The skyscrapers are located east of 163 Marsh Wall on the Isle of Dogs, to the immediate south of Canary Wharf's commercial district. The nearest stations are South Quay DLR and Heron Quays DLR. The closest London Underground station is Canary Wharf.

See also 
List of tallest buildings and structures in London
List of tallest buildings in the United Kingdom

References

Further reading 
London's highest botanical gin garden goes on sale at theguardian.com

External links 
  Wardianlondon.com
Glenn Howells Architecture website GlennHowells.co.uk

Canary Wharf buildings
Proposed skyscrapers in London
Skyscrapers in the London Borough of Tower Hamlets
Millwall